Matías Daniel Juárez Romero (born 3 January 1997) is an Argentine professional footballer who plays as a midfielder.

Career
Juárez got his professional career underway with Huracán. He first appeared on a first-team teamsheet in February 2016, being an unused substitute for a Copa Libertadores match with Atlético Nacional on 24 February; as well as in the Argentine Primera División versus San Lorenzo days later. Five months after, in July, Juárez made his senior debut in the Copa Argentina against Central Córdoba; he was subbed on for the final nine minutes in place of Norberto Briasco-Balekian. Juárez next featured again in the same competition thirteen months following in a tie with Colón.

Career statistics
.

References

External links

1997 births
Living people
Footballers from Córdoba, Argentina
Argentine footballers
Association football midfielders
Argentine Primera División players
Club Atlético Huracán footballers